Queensland Conservatorium Griffith University (formerly the Queensland Conservatorium of Music) is a selective, audition based music school located in Brisbane, Queensland, Australia, and is part of Griffith University.

History
The Conservatorium was established by the state government and opened on 18 February 1957, with English composer William Lovelock as director. The school was originally located in South Brisbane Town Hall. In 1971 the Conservatorium became autonomous from the state government as a College of Advanced Education, and in 1975 relocated to a new complex at Gardens Point. The school opened a second campus in Mackay in 1989, which became part of Central Queensland University in 1995.

The Dawkins Revolution led to the Conservatorium becoming an institution of Griffith University in 1991. As part of this amalgamation, the school moved into its current facility in the South Bank Parklands in 1996, and was renamed Queensland Conservatorium Griffith University. Queensland University of Technology took over the Conservatorium's Garden Point facilities, including the QUT Gardens Theatre as it became known.

The institution is affectionately known as "the Con" to students. In 1999, the Conservatorium launched its Bachelor of Popular Music program and its new Gold Coast campus, both of which were established under the direction of Associate Professor Garry Tamlyn. From 2000 this course has been taught from an information technology facility in the Gold Coast Campus of Griffith University. In 2003 the Conservatorium Research Centre was opened as part of the 30 innovative research centres in the University. The Research Centre aims to investigate the dynamics of contemporary musical environments.

Facilities
Facilities include the Conservatorium Theatre—also used for smaller productions by Opera Queensland— which seats a maximum of 727 and has one of the highest fly towers in Australia, the Ian Hanger Recital Hall which seats 200 and the Basil Jones Orchestra Hall. There are also music production, post production, multimedia lab and recording facilities both in the South Bank and Gold Coast Campuses.

The Queensland Conservatorium also includes the Young Conservatorium, an external, classical based music program for pre-schoolers to year 12 students. In the past 12 months the "Young Con" has engaged more than 1500 students in performances.

In 2007 the Conservatorium celebrated its 50th anniversary with alumni reunions and visiting artists from around the world.

Staff

Former directors
Former director include:
William Lovelock (1957–1959)
Basil Jones (1960–1980)
Roy Wales (1981–1987)
Anthony Camden (1988–1993)
Simone De Haan (1996–2002)
Peter Roennfeldt (2002–2009)
Huib Schippers (2009–2012)
Don Lebler (2012–2013; acting)
Scott Harrison (2013–2020)

Notable staff
Notable staff include:

Julian Byzantine
John Curro
Janet Delpratt
Margreta Elkins
Ralph Hultgren
Carmel Kaine
Stephen Leek
Peter Musson
Max Olding
Jan Sedivka
Larry Sitsky
Donald Smith, father of alumnus Robin Donald
Paul Terracini 1982–88
Vanessa Tomlinson
Carl Vine
Lev Vlassenko
Natasha Vlassenko
Nancy Weir
Christopher Wrench

Alumni
Notable students who attended the Queensland Conservatorium of Music include:

Daniel Amalm
Jason Barry-Smith
Jeffrey Black
Ray Chen
Gerry Connolly
Sarah Crane
Tyson Illingworth (known as TyDi)
Brett Dean
Candy Devine
Robin Donald, son of Conservatorium teacher Donald Smith
Helen Donaldson
Lisa Gasteen
Clare Gormley and Miriam Gormley
Dami Im
Graeme Jennings
Astrid Jorgensen
Kanon (singer)
Lynette Lancini
Piers Lane
Rosario La Spina
Adam Lopez
Tahu Matheson
Kate Miller-Heidke
Katie Noonan
Barnaby Ralph
John Rodgers (musician)
Barry Singh
Megan Washington
Jonathon Welch
Christopher Wrench
The Kite String Tangle
 TwoSet Violin (Brett Yang and Eddy Chen)

Awards

APRA Classical Music Awards
The APRA Classical Music Awards are presented annually by Australasian Performing Right Association (APRA) and Australian Music Centre (AMC).

|-
| 2006 || Encounters: Meetings in Australian Music program – curated by Vincent Plush – Queensland Conservatorium Research Centre, Griffith University || Outstanding Contribution by an Organisation ||

References

External links
 
 Queensland Conservatorium Events Homepage

APRA Award winners
Music schools in Australia
Education in Brisbane
Culture of Brisbane
Tourist attractions in Brisbane
Buildings and structures in Brisbane
Griffith University
1957 establishments in Australia
Educational institutions established in 1957
South Brisbane, Queensland
Colleges of Advanced Education